Bulbie "Donovan" Bennett ( – 30 October 2005) was a Jamaican criminal and gang leader of the Klansman (or Klans Massive) based in Spanish Town, St. Catherine. He was formerly listed by the Jamaica Constabulary Force as number one of Jamaica's top ten most wanted criminals for over ten years before his death.

Background
Born in King Street, Spanish Town, Bennett gradually built up a criminal empire through murder and extortion whose assets included eighty motor vehicles and heavy equipment used in construction and hauling industries throughout Jamaica. A member of the Clansmen, authorities believe he gained leadership through the murder of then leader Derrick "Puppy String" Eccleston on 12 May 1993. During the early 1990s, he led the gang against their rivals the One Order Gang resulting in numerous gangland shootings and other violence in Spanish Town.

He later established an elaborate extortion operations targeting local business, particularly taximen, in both the central and south central regions of St. Catherine. He would later be connected to criminal activities in Old Harbour and Portmore, St. Catherine and May Pen.

He was thought to have briefly fled from authorities in Kingston to Great Britain under a false identity in 2001.

Death
Refusing to surrender to authorities, he and his driver were finally killed (and a woman taken into custody) in a gun battle against members of a joint police/military operation part of Operation Kingfish who attempted to bring him in for questioning on his alleged involvement in eighty unsolved homicides as well as charges of assault and extortion at his home in Tanakay district of Rock River, Clarendon. At the time of his death, his wealth was estimated at $100 million (Bennett's weapon, a .50 Desert Eagle, was found to be worth $2,000).

Later investigations under Superintendent Kenneth Wade found cooperation between Bennett and members of the People's National Party, of which he was given political support and supplied him with information while he operated in areas dominated by the party.

During the days following his death, members of his gang reacted violently to his death from blocking roads to firing upon the Spanish Town Police Station and burning effigies of National Security Minister, Dr. Peter Phillips.

References

External links
Jamaica Star - Lights out for "Bulbie"
Jamaica Star - "We did not know"
Police brace for "Bulbie's" funeral

1960s births
2005 deaths
Fugitives wanted by Jamaica
Jamaican crime bosses
People from Saint Catherine Parish
People shot dead by law enforcement officers in Jamaica
Yardies